The Madison Public Schools is a comprehensive community public school district that serves students in pre-kindergarten through twelfth grade from Madison, in Morris County, New Jersey, United States.

As of the 2018–19 school year, the district, comprising five schools, had an enrollment of 2,646 students and 219.5 classroom teachers (on an FTE basis), for a student–teacher ratio of 12.1:1.

The district is classified by the New Jersey Department of Education as being in District Factor Group "I", the second-highest of eight groupings. District Factor Groups organize districts statewide to allow comparison by common socioeconomic characteristics of the local districts. From lowest socioeconomic status to highest, the categories are A, B, CD, DE, FG, GH, I and J.

The district's high school also serves the neighboring community of Harding Township, who attend as part of a sending/receiving relationship with the Harding Township School District.

Average K-12 class sizes range from 19-22 students. 70% of faculty members possess advanced degrees, and all faculty members fulfilled the Highly Qualified Teacher standards established by the federal No Child Left Behind legislation. 90% of Madison High graduates annually attend institutions of higher learning. Madison High School is accredited by the Middle States Association of Colleges and Schools.

Curriculum
The district provides a comprehensive K-12 curriculum of study in language arts, mathematics, science, social studies, world languages (Spanish, French, Italian, Mandarin Chinese), music, visual and performing arts, computer sciences, health and physical education.  Educationally disabled students are provided with a full continuum of educational supports. Madison High School provides students with the opportunity to participate in 18 Advanced Placement Program courses. The school's partnered with the Borough of Madison on the community-wide Rosenet computer network and K-12 students have extensive access to computer technology.

Extracurricular activities
The Madison School District offers a comprehensive extracurricular program.  Madison High School features 45 boys and girls athletic teams spanning 18 sports. Competing in the Northwest Jersey Athletic Conference, Madison High School teams have earned an ample array of conference, county, and state titles.  Music students participate in orchestra, band and chorus beginning in elementary school, and numerous Madison High School music students are chosen annually to participate in regional and state select performing groups.

Schools

Schools in the district (with 2018–19 enrollment data from the National Center for Education Statistics) are:

Elementary schools
Central Avenue School (499 students; in grades PreK-5)
Thomas Liss, Principal
Kings Road School (310; K-5)
Kathleen Koop, Principal
Torey J. Sabatini School (316; K-5)
Ileana Garcia, Principal
Middle school
Madison Junior School (618; 6-8)
Brooke Phillips, Principal
Frank Perrone, Assistant Principal
High school
Madison High School (879; 9-12)
David Drechsel, Principal
Kelly Bosworth, Assistant Principal
Christine Internicola, Assistant Principal
Todd Jensen, Assistant Principal
Andrea Padelsky, Assistant Principal

Administration
Core members of the district's administration are:
Mark Schwarz, Superintendent
Daniel J. Ross, Esq., Assistant Superintendent for Curriculum, Instruction, and Personnel
Dr. Frank Santora, Assistant Superintendent for Pupil Personnel Services
Danielle Mancuso, Business Administrator / Board Secretary

Board of education
The district's board of education, with seven members, sets policy and oversees the fiscal and educational operation of the district through its administration. As a Type II school district, the board's trustees are elected directly by voters to serve three-year terms of office on a staggered basis, with three seats up for election each year held (since 2012) as part of the November general election. An eighth trustee is appointed to represent Harding Township.

Noted alumni
Notable district alumni include:
Janeane Garofalo (born 1964), actress who attended, but did not graduate from Madison High School.
Neil O'Donnell (born 1966), quarterback for the Pittsburgh Steelers, Cincinnati Bengals, and New York Jets.

References

External links
Madison Public Schools

School Data for the Madison Public Schools, National Center for Education Statistics

Madison, New Jersey
New Jersey District Factor Group I
School districts in Morris County, New Jersey